Victor Gabriel Prunelle (23 June 1777, La Tour-du-Pin – 20 August 1853) was a French physician who served as the Mayor of Lyon from 1830 to 1839.

1777 births
1853 deaths
People from Isère
Politicians from Auvergne-Rhône-Alpes
Orléanists
Members of the 1st Chamber of Deputies of the July Monarchy
Members of the 2nd Chamber of Deputies of the July Monarchy
Members of the 3rd Chamber of Deputies of the July Monarchy
Members of the 4th Chamber of Deputies of the July Monarchy
Mayors of Lyon
19th-century French physicians
Members of the French Academy of Sciences